Club Deportivo Utrillas is a Spanish football team based in Utrillas, in the autonomous community of Aragon. Founded in 1958, the club plays in the Tercera Federación – Group 17, and holds home games at Campo de Fútbol La Vega, with a capacity of 2,500 seats.

Season to season

12 seasons in Tercera División
1 season in Tercera Federación

References

External links
Soccerway team profile

Football clubs in Aragon
Association football clubs established in 1958
1958 establishments in Spain